George Jacob Karstens Jr. (February 9, 1924 – December 5, 2002) was an American football center who played one season in the National Football League (NFL) for the Detroit Lions. He played college football for Indiana.

Karstens was born on February 9, 1924, in Chicago, Illinois. He attended Austin Community Academy High School there before playing college football for the Indiana Hoosiers. He was the Hoosiers' starting center in most of his time with the team, earning three varsity letters.

After graduating, Karstens was signed by the Detroit Lions of the National Football League (NFL) as an undrafted free agent following the 1949 NFL Draft. He appeared in two games before being waived on October 12.

After his brief professional football career, Karstens was a long-time teacher and school principal in the Lyons and Stickney school districts. He also was a football coach and referee. He died on December 5, 2002, at the age of 78.

References

1924 births
2002 deaths
Players of American football from Chicago
American football centers
Indiana Hoosiers football players
Detroit Lions players